Lüftlmalerei (also spelt Lüftelmalerei) is a form of mural art that is native to villages and towns of southern Germany and Austria, especially in Upper Bavaria (Werdenfelser Land) and in the Tyrol.

Style 

The origin of the term is disputed but may have come from the name of the home of façade artist, Franz Seraph Zwinck (1748–1792) of Oberammergau, Zum Lüftl.

Lüftlmalerei is a popular, folk-oriented variation of trompe-l'œil from the Baroque and imitates architectural elements. As in 'high architecture' it also embeds pictorial cartouches, mirrors and fields. Its subject matter ranges from the patron saints of houses or house emblems to representations of Biblical stories and the classical motifs of peasant art from everyday rural life to hunting. Banners with mottos are common and the sundial is also a popular element. 

The paintings are applied to the fresh lime plaster using a fresco technique, whereby the colours silicify with the plaster in a chemical reaction and the paintings are thus able to survive for a long time. Today, other weatherproof painting materials are also used.

Architectural examples

Literature 
 Herbert Meider, Franz Stoltefaut: Lüftlmalerei an Isar, Partnach, Loisach und Ammer. Medien-Verlag Schubert, 2003, .
 Paul Ernst Rattelmüller: Lüftlmalerei in Oberbayern. Süddeutscher Verlag, München 1981.

External links 

 Lüftlmalerei in Mittenwald (with numerous illustrations)
 Julia Ricker: Bilderbuchdörfer. Die hohe Kunst der Lüftlmalerei in Mittenwald und Oberammergau. In: Monumente Online, June 2016.

Painting techniques
Murals
Baroque
Culture of Altbayern
Tyrolean culture